Justicia is a large, broadly distributed genus of flowering plants in the family Acanthaceae. , there are over 900 accepted species in Kew's Plants of the World Online.

References

L
Justicia